Ryde Bus Depot is a bus depot in the Sydney suburb of Ryde operated by Busways.

History
Ryde Bus Depot opened on 28 June 1953, the same day that Ultimo Tram Depot closed. It initially took over the operation of these routes, which were a combination of tram replacement routes and existing services operated by Burwood Bus Depot:

In December 1999 Sydney Buses purchased the business of North & Western Bus Lines whose depot adjoined. After initially operating as Gladesville depot, both were integrated. However because of the topography of the land, both remain physically separated with each having its own entrance. 

In January 2022 it was included in the transfer of region 7 from State Transit to Busways.

As of November 2022, it has an allocation of 293 buses.

References

External links
Service NSW

Bus garages
Industrial buildings in Sydney
Transport infrastructure completed in 1953
1953 establishments in Australia